The 2015 Nova Scotia Scotties Tournament of Hearts, the provincial women's curling championship of Nova Scotia, was held from January 20 to 25 at the Dartmouth Curling Club in Dartmouth, Nova Scotia. The winning team represented Nova Scotia at the national level 2015 Scotties Tournament of Hearts in Moose Jaw, Saskatchewan.

Teams
The teams are listed as follows:

Round robin standings
Final Round Robin Standings

Round robin results

Draw 1
Wednesday, January 21, 1:00 pm

Draw 2
Wednesday, January 21, 7:00 pm

Draw 3
Thursday, January 22, 1:00 pm

Draw 4
Thursday, January 22, 7:00 pm

Draw 5
Friday, January 23, 1:00 pm

Draw 6
Friday, January 23, 7:00 pm

Draw 7
Saturday, January 24, 1:00 pm

Tiebreaker
Saturday, January 24, 3:00 pm

Playoffs

Semifinal
Sunday, January 25, 9:00 am

Final
Sunday, January 25, 2:00 pm

References

Nova Scotia
Curling competitions in Halifax, Nova Scotia
Sport in Dartmouth, Nova Scotia
Scotties Tournament of Hearts
Nova Scotia Scotties Tournament of Hearts